Dr. Šemso Tucaković, Ph.D, is a Bosnian writer, historian and faculty member in the Department of Political Sciences at the University of Sarajevo.

He has also written about the Bosnian Muslim (Bosniak) experience during World War II in occupied Yugoslavia, as well as during the disintegration of Yugoslavia in the 1990s.

Work
His best-known works include: 
Aladža Džamija - Ubijeni Monument
Crimes Against Bosnian Muslims 1941-1945
Forgotten Genocide of Bosniak Muslims Around Srebrenica Region in 1943

References

Living people
Bosniaks of Bosnia and Herzegovina
Bosnia and Herzegovina Muslims
Academic staff of the University of Sarajevo
Historians of World War II
Year of birth missing (living people)
Place of birth missing (living people)
21st-century Bosnia and Herzegovina historians